Ahmed Tijani is a male Muslim given name formed from the elements Ahmed and Tijani. It may refer to:

Ahmad al-Tijani (1735–1815), Algerian founder of the Tijaniyya Sufi order
Ahmed Tijani Ahmed (1941–2006), Nigerian politician
Ahmed Tijani Ben Omar (born 1950), Ghanaian Islamic scholar and Imam
Ahmad Tijani Ali Cisse (born 1955), Senegalese leader of the Tijaniyya Sufi order
Ahmad Tijani (born 1987), Nigerian footballer
Ahmad al-Tijani (born 1943), Tunisian Islamic scholar and Imam

Arabic masculine given names